Dolany nad Vltavou (until 2016 Dolany) is a municipality and village in Mělník District in the Central Bohemian Region of the Czech Republic. It has about 900 inhabitants. The historic centre of Debrno within the municipality is well preserved and protected by law as a village monument zone.

Administrative parts
The village of Debrno is an administrative part of Dolany nad Vltavou.

Geography

The municipality is located on the left bank of the Vltava River in the place, where the rocky valley of the Vltava ends and begins a plain typical for the confluence of the rivers Vltava and Elbe.

References

Villages in Mělník District